Highways in Guam are maintained by the Department of Public Works of the United States territory of Guam.


List

See also

References

Guam
Guam